Fencing competitions at the 2019 Pan American Games in Lima, Peru are scheduled to be held between August 5 and 10, 2019 at the Lima Convention Centre.

12 medal events are scheduled to be contested, in the three disciplines of épée, foil and sabre. In each discipline an individual and team event will be held for each gender. A total of 156 fencers will qualify to compete at the games.

Medal table

Medalists

Men's events

Women's events

Participating nations
A total of 15 countries qualified athletes. The number of athletes a nation entered is in parentheses beside the name of the country.

Qualification

A total of 156 fencers will qualify to compete. Each nation may enter a maximum of 18 athletes (nine per gender). The top seven teams at the 2018 Pan American Championships, along with the top two individuals not qualified through the team event will qualify for each respective discipline per gender. The host nation, Peru, automatically qualifies the maximum number of fencers (18). A maximum of two athletes from one NOC can enter the individual events.

See also
Fencing at the 2020 Summer Olympics

References

External links
Results book (Archived version)

 
Events at the 2019 Pan American Games
Pan American Games
2019